The 1985 Tour of the Basque Country was the 25th edition of the Tour of the Basque Country cycle race and was held from 1 April to 5 April 1985. The race started in Bera and finished in Erauskin. The race was won by Pello Ruiz Cabestany of the Orbea–Gin MG team.

General classification

References

Further reading
 

1985
Bas